Sir John Trevelyan, 2nd Baronet (9 April 1670 – 25 September 1755) of Nettlecombe, Somerset was a British landowner and Tory politician who sat in the English and British House of Commons between 1695 and 1722.

Trevelyan was the eldest surviving son of Sir George Trevelyan, 1st Baronet of Nettlecombe Court and his wife Margaret Willoughby, daughter of John Willoughby of Ley Hill, Honiton, Devon. A year old, in 1671, he succeeded to the baronetcy on the death of his father. He matriculated at Wadham College, Oxford in 1687.

Trevelyan sat as Member of Parliament for Somerset from 1695 to 1698 and in 1701 and was appointed High Sheriff of Somerset for the year 1704 to 1705. He was returned as MP for Minehead at the 1708 general election to 1715 and from 1717 to 1722.

Trevelyan died in September 1755, aged 85, having held the baronetcy for 84 years. He had married twice: firstly Urith Pole, the daughter of Sir John Pole, 3rd Baronet of Shute, with whom he had a daughter who predeceased him and secondly Susanna Warren, the daughter and heiress of William Warren of Stallensthorn, Devon, with whom he had 3 sons and 5 daughters. He was succeeded in the baronetcy by George Trevelyan, 3rd Baronet.

References

1670 births
1755 deaths
Baronets in the Baronetage of England
High Sheriffs of Somerset
Members of the Parliament of Great Britain for English constituencies
English MPs 1695–1698
English MPs 1701
British MPs 1708–1710
British MPs 1710–1713
British MPs 1713–1715
British MPs 1715–1722